Andrzej Rybski (born March 11, 1985) is a Polish retired footballer who played as a forward.

Career

Club
In February 2011, he joined Termalica Bruk-Bet Nieciecza.

Widzew Łódź II
Joining MKP Pogoń Siedlce in February 2018, he left the club in September 2019 to join the reserve team of his former club, Widzew Łódź.

References

External links
 

1985 births
Polish footballers
Odra Wodzisław Śląski players
Polonia Bytom players
Lechia Gdańsk players
Widzew Łódź players
Bruk-Bet Termalica Nieciecza players
Chojniczanka Chojnice players
KS Polkowice players
ŁKS Łomża players
Zawisza Bydgoszcz players
MKP Pogoń Siedlce players
Ekstraklasa players
I liga players
II liga players
Living people
People from Wolfsburg
Association football forwards
Footballers from Lower Saxony